Crooked Lake may refer to:

 Crooked Lake (Florida), an Outstanding Florida Water
 Crooked Lake Park, Florida, a census designated place in Polk County
 Crooked Lake (Idaho), a glacial lake in Custer County, Idaho
 Crooked Lake, Indiana, an unincorporated community in Steuben County
 Crooked Lake (Michigan), in Emmet County and part of the Inland Waterway
 Crooked Lake (Independence Township, Michigan)
 Crooked Lake (Minnesota–Ontario)
 Crooked Lake Township, Cass County, Minnesota
 Crooked Lake (New York)
 Crooked Lake, Nova Scotia
 Crooked Lake (Saskatchewan)
 Crooked Lake (South Dakota)
 Keuka Lake, New York, formerly referred to as Crooked Lake

See also 
 At Crooked Lake, an album by Crazy Horse
 Crooked Lake Canal, New York
 Crooked Lake Outlet Historic District, New York